Rosemount High School is an English-language high school located in Montreal, Quebec, Canada. It opened in 1951. The school offers a special music program as well as drama and visual arts programs. Today, the school offers a French-immersion program in addition to its English core program. It is situated on Beaubien street East, across the street from park Etienne-Desmarteau and College Rosemont. There is a soccer field and tennis court behind the school.

School facilities include two double gymnasiums, an auditorium that can seat 762 people, a library, a computer lab, specialized drama & art rooms, two circular sound-proofed music rooms, and a large soccer field. The school is made up of 3 wings, 2 of those wings having 2 floors. The 2100 wing is the main hallway where you will find the old gym, the main office and the guidance office. The 3100 wing is situated right on top of the 2100 wing and has classrooms.  The 2400 wing is on the same floor as the 2100 wing. It has classrooms, the computer lab, the library, the New Gym, the art room and a science lab. The 3400 wing has classrooms including a large drama room and a senior square for the senior students to hang out. The 3300 wing has science labs and classrooms.

The Music Concentration Program actually has its own wing located behind the school's auditorium. The school's auditorium can hold up to 762 people and is named after the founder of the music department and a dedicated music teacher at the school for many years who died in the 90s, Mrs. Helen Hall.

The school is managed by the English Montreal School Board.

References

External links
Rosemount High School

High schools in Montreal
English-language schools in Quebec
English Montreal School Board
Rosemont–La Petite-Patrie